The Gonzaga Collection or Celeste Gallery (la Celeste Galeria) was the large collection of artworks commissioned and acquired by the House of Gonzaga in Mantua, Italy, exhibited for a time in the Palazzo Ducale, the Palazzo Te, the Palazzo San Sebastiano and other buildings in Mantua and elsewhere.

The Gonzagas were inspired by the wunderkammer style of collecting practised by the princes of Bavaria, with Isabella d'Este in particular creating a noted private 'studiolo'. They set an example for other European courts, particularly in their patronage of contemporary artists, whilst their collecting increased the international profile of Mantua, a relatively small state. It reached its peak under Vincenzo I Gonzaga and his son Ferdinando, before the family's decline led to major losses from the collection, such as the long negotiations from 1625 onwards with Charles I of Great Britain, mediated by two members of the Whitehall Group – the Flemish art dealer Daniel Nys and Nicholas Lanier, Master of the King's Music. These culminated in 1627 with most of the Gonzaga collections being sent to London. This ensured their preservation, unlike the artworks still in Mantua when the city was sacked in 1630.

Its works are now split between museums and private collections across the world, as shown by the 2002–2003 exhibition Gonzaga. La Celeste Galeria. Il Museo dei Duchi di Mantova at the Palazzo Te and Palazzo Ducale, which included around ninety paintings from the total of approximately 2000 originally in the collection. As well as paintings, the collection also included decorative work in gold and precious stones such as the Gonzaga Cameo along with natural history specimens or 'mirabilia'.

List

A 

Anonymous
Gonzaga Cameo*, classical cameo
 Lely Venus, classical sculpture

Cristofano Allori
 Judith with the Head of Holofernes, 1613, oil on canvas, 120x100, Royal Collection
Sofonisba Anguissola
Bernardino Campi painting a portrait of Sofonisba Angiussola, 1556 circa, oil on canvas, 111×109,5, Siena, Pinacoteca Nazionale
 Self portrait at the easel (?), Lancut, Muzeum Zamet

B 
Giovanni Baglione
Allegory of Justice and Peace, oil on canvas, 255,3×227, Royal Collection
Apollo, oil on canvas, 195×150, Arras, Musée des Beaux-Arts
Calliope, oil on canvas, 195×150, Arras, Musée des Beaux-Arts
Clio, oil on canvas, 195×150, Arras, Musée des Beaux-Arts
Erato, oil on canvas, 195×150, Arras, Musée des Beaux-Arts
Euterpe, oil on canvas, 195×15, Arras, Musée des Beaux-Arts
Polymnia, oil on canvas, 195×150, Arras, Musée des Beaux-Arts
Terpsichore, oil on canvas, 195×150, Arras, Musée des Beaux-Arts
Thalia, oil on canvas, 195×150, Arras, Musée des Beaux-Arts
Urania, oil on canvas, 195×150, Arras, Musée des Beaux-Arts

Jacopo Bassano
 Christ in the house of Martha, Mary and Lazarus, oil on canvas 98×126,5, Houston, Sarah Campbell Blaffer Gallery

Pieter Bruegel the Younger
Wedding Feast, oil on panel, 89×112 cm, Dublin, National Gallery of Ireland

C 
[[File:Carracci-Butcher's shop.jpg|thumb|The Butcher's Shop''', Annibale Carracci]]
Annibale CarracciThe Butcher's Shop, 1582–1583, oil on canvas, 185×266 cm, Oxford, Christ Church Picture Gallery

Ludovico CarracciEcstacy of St Francis, oil on panel, 67×51, Parma, private collection

CorreggioThe School of Love, (1527–1528) oil on canvas, 155,6×91,4 cm, London, National GalleryVenus and Cupid with a Satyr, (1523–1525) oil on canvas, 190×124 cm, Paris, Musée du LouvreAllegory of Vice , 1532–1534, oil on canvas, 149×88 cm, Paris, Musée du LouvreAllegory of Virtue , 1532–1534, oil on canvas, 149×88 cm, Paris, Musée du LouvreHoly Family with St Jerome, oil on panel, 68,8×56×1,8, Royal CollectionDanae, (1531?), oil on panel, 161×193 cm, Rome, Galleria BorgheseLeda and the Swan, (1531?), olio su tavola, 152×191 cm, Berlin, Staatliche Museen zu BerlinRape of Ganymede, (1531?), oil on panel, 163,5×70,5 cm, Vienna, Kunsthistorisches Museum, GemaeldegalerieJupiter and Io, (1531?), oil on panel, 163,5×74 cm, Vienna, Kunsthistorisches Museum, Gemaeldegalerie

Lorenzo CostaReign of Comus, 1504, oil on panel, 160×192 cm, Paris, Musée du LouvreIsabella d'Este in the kingdom of Harmonia or Allegory of the coronation of Isabella d'Este, 1505, oil on panel, 164,5×197,5 cm, Paris, Musée du LouvrePortrait of a woman with a dog, 1500 circa, oil on panel, 45,5×35,1 cm, Royal CollectionMadonna and Child, 1500 circa, painting on panel, 71×55 cm, London, private collection

Lucas Cranach (after)Lucretia, oil on panel, 42×27,7, Siena, Pinacoteca Nazionale

 D 
Domenichino (born Domenico Zampieri)Rinaldo and Armida, oil on canvas, 121×167, Paris, Musée du LouvreSant'Agnese, oil on canvas, 212,7×152,4, Royal Collection

Ludovico DondiJulius Caesar in his triumphal chariot, oil on copper, 19,5×18,5 Munich, Alte PinakothekMen carrying booty and trophies of royal armour, oil on copper, 18,5×10 Munich, Alte PinakothekMen carrying booty, trumpeters and sacrificial bulls, oil on copper, 19,5×16,5 Munich, Alte PinakothekPrisoners and standard bearers, oil on copper, 19,5×19, Munich, Alte PinakothekTrophies, war machines, inscriptions and representations of defeated cities, oil on copper, 20×18, Munich, Alte Pinakothek

 F 

Domenico FettiChrist in the Garden, oil on canvas, 90,5×55,5 Prague, National GalleryElijah Triumphing over the Prophets of Baal, oil on panel, 61,2×70,5, Royal CollectionSage-seed greenhouse, oil on panel, 60,8×44,5, Prague, Castle GalleryMargherita Gonzaga receiving the model of the Church of S.Orsola, 1619–1623, oil on canvas, 245×276 cm, Mantua, Museo del Palazzo Ducale Portrait of an astronomer, oil on canvas, 98×73,5, Dresden, GemaldegaleriePosthumous portrait of Federico II Gonzaga, I Duke of Mantua, oil on canvas, 99×88, Vienna, Kunsthistorisches Museum, Gemaeldegaleire Vision of St Peter, oil on panel, 66×51, Vienna, Kunsthistorisches MuseumThe Penitent Magdalene, 1617–21, oil on canvas, 98×78,5 cm, Rome, Galleria Doria Pamphilj

Lavinia FontanaPortrait of Antonietta Gonzalus, 1594–1595, oil on panel, 57×46 cm, Blois, Musée du Chateau
 The Queen of Sheba Visiting King Solomon, Dublin, National Gallery of Ireland

 G 
Lorenzo GarbieriCirce, oil on panel, 66×52 – Pinacoteca Nazionale di Bologna

GarofaloThe Holy Family with the Infant St John the Baptist and St Elisabeth, oil on panel, 47,5×32, London, Courtauld Institute of Art

Guercino Erminia among the shepherds, oil on canvas, 149×178, Birmingham (UK), Birmingham Museum & Art Gallery

 L 

Lorenzo LottoTriple portrait of a goldsmith, 1530 circa, 52,1×79,1 cm, Vienna, Kunsthistorisches Museum

 M 
Andrea MantegnaDeath of the Virgin, 1462 circa, tempera and gold on canvas, 54×42 cm, Madrid, Museo del PradoChrist Bearing the Soul of the Virgin, 1462, tempera on panel, 27,5×17,5 cm, Ferrara, Pinacoteca NazionalePortrait of Francesco Gonzaga, 1460–1462, tempera on panel, 25,5×18 cm, Naples, Museo Nazionale di CapodimonteUffizi Triptych, 1464 ca, tempera on panel, 161,5×86 cm, Firenze, Galleria degli UffiziThe Dead Christ, 1475–1478 circa, tempera on canvas, 68×81 cm, Milan, Pinacoteca di BreraTriumphs of Caesar, 1486–1492, nine canvases, each 3m by 3m, Royal Collection (Hampton Court)Christ as the Suffering Redeemer, 1488 – 1500, tempera on panel, 78×48 cm, Copenhagen, Statens Museum for KunstSibyl and Prophet, 1495–1500, tempera on canvas, 58,4×51,1 cm, Cincinnati, Cincinnati Art MuseumSofonisba, 1495–1500, egg tempera on panel, 72,1×19,8 cm, London, National GalleryDido, 1495–1500, glue tempera and gold on linen canvas, 65,3×31,4 cm, Montreal, Montreal Museum of Fine ArtsJudith, 1495–1500, glue tempera and gold on linen canvas, 65×31 cm, Montreal, Montreal Museum of Fine ArtsTuccia, 1495–1500, egg tempera on panel, 72,5×23 cm, London, National GalleryMars and Venus, 1497, tempera on canvas, 160×192 cm, Paris, Musée du LouvreTriumph of Virtue or Minerva casting out the Vices from the garden of Virtue, 1499–1502, tempera su tela, 160×192 cm, Paris, Musée du LouvreMadonna of Victory, 1496, tempera on canvas, 280×166 cm, Paris, Musée du Louvre
Michelangelo Sleeping Cupid, sculpture
Domenico MoroneBattle at the Bonacolsi, 1462 circa, oil on canvas, Mantova, Museo del Palazzo Ducale

 P 

Pietro PeruginoCombat of Love and Chastity or Battle of Chastity against Lust, 1508, oil on canvas, 158×180 cm, Musée du Louvre

Frans Pourbus the YoungerFull length portrait of Vincenzo I Gonzaga, 1604–1605, oil on canvas, 202×112 cm, Mantua, private collectionPortrait of Vincenzo I Gonzaga, 1600, oil on canvas, 108×88 cm, Vienna, Kunsthistorisches Museum, GemaeldegaleriePortrait of Margaret of Savoy, Duchess of Mantua, 1605, oil on canvas, 193×115 cm, Florence, Galleria PalatinaPortrait of Eleonora de' Medici, Duchess of Mantua, 1603, oil on canvas, 84×67 cm, Florence, Galleria PalatinaPortrait of Vincenzo I Gonzaga, 1610 circa, oil on canvas, 114×108,5 cm, Mantua, Palazzo d'ArcoPortrait of Margaret of Savoy, 1608, oil on canvas, 206,5×116,3 cm, Saint Petersburg, Hermitage Museum

 R 

Guido Reni The Labours of Hercules, 1617–1621, a series of four canvases commissioned by Duke Ferdinando Gonzaga, Paris, Musée du Louvre:Hercules on fireHercules and ArchelausHercules and the Hydra Nessus raping DeianiraGuido Reni (after)The Toilet of Venus, London, National Gallery

Giulio RomanoMadonna and Child with St Anne, oil on panel, 58×48, frame under construction, Prague, Castle GalleryJupiter, Neptune and Pluto, oil on panel, 110,5×133,4, Mantua, private collectionEmperor on horseback, oil on panel, 83×54 London, Trafalgar GalleriesThe Birth of Bacchus, oil on panel, 126,5×80, Los Angeles, J. Paul Getty MuseumLa Perla (using drawings by Raphael), 1518–1520 circa, oil on canvas, 144×115 cm, Madrid, Museo del PradoPortrait of Margherita Paleologa, 1531 circa, oil on canvas, 115,5×90,5 cm, Royal Collection
Workshop of Giulio RomanoFortune, 1520–46, oil on canvas, 96,2×49,8 cm, Royal CollectionJupiter and Juno taking possession of the throne of Paradise, 1530, oil on canvas, 111×135,5 cm, Royal CollectionThe Theatre of the Caesars: Nero plays while Rome burns, 1536-9, oil on canvas, 121.5 x 106.7 cm, Royal Collection

Pieter Paul Rubens
 The Gonzaga Family Adoring the Holy Trinity, 1604–1605, oil on canvas di cm 381×477 cm, Mantua, Museo del Palazzo Ducale
 Self-portrait with friends in Mantua, 1602–1604, oil on canvas, 78×101 cm, Cologne, Wallraf-Richartz Museum of Fine Arts
 Council of the Gods, oil on canvas, 204×379 cm, Prague, Castle Gallery
 Aeneas prepares to lead the Trojan survivors into exile, 1602–1603,oil on canvas, 146×227 cm, Fontainebleau, Musée National du Chateau (stored at the Louvre)
 Portrait of Eleonora I aged two, 76×485 cm, Innsbruck, Ambras Castle
 Portrait of Eleonora Gonzaga aged three, 1620 circa, oil on canvas, 76×49,5 cm, Vienna, Kunsthistorisches, Gemaeldegalerie
 Portrait of Ferdinando Gonzaga, oil on canvas, 112×87×12 cm, Bowral, Australia, Collezione privata
 Portrait of Isabella d'Este, 101,80×81 cm, Vienna, Kunsthistorisches Museum, Gemaldegalerie
 Portrait of Maria de' Medici, oil on canvas, 80×60 cm, London, private collection (Mr. Wakhevitch)
 Portrait of Vincenzo II, oil on canvas, 67×51,5 cm, Vienna, Kunsthistorisches Museum, Gemaeldegalerie

 T 

Domenico Tintoretto
 Tancred baptising Clorinda, 1585 circa, oil on canvas, 168×115 cm, Houston, Museum of Fine Arts
 Mary Magdalene, Rome, Pinacoteca Capitolina

Jacopo Tintoretto 
 Prince Philip II's Entry into Mantua, oil on canvas, 211,7×330 Munich, Alte Pinakothek
 Federico II Gonzaga at the siege of Parma, oil on canvas, 213×276 cm, Munich, Alte Pinakothek
 Francesco II Gonzaga at the Battle of Fornovo on the Taro, oil on canvas, 269×421 cm, Munich, Alte Pinakothek
 Coronation of Marchese Gianfrancesco Gonzaga, oil on canvas, 272×432 cm, Munich, Alte Pinakothek
 Rape of Helen, oil on canvas, 186×307 cm, Madrid, Museo del Prado
 Esther Before Ahasuerus, 1552–1555 (?), oil on canvas, 59×203 cm, Royal Collection
 The Muses of Music, Royal Collection

Titian

 Portrait of Suliman the Magnificent, 99×85 cm, Innsbruck, Ambras Castle
 Woman with a Mirror, 1515 circa, oil on canvas, 99×76 cm, Paris, Musée du Louvre
 Tarquin and Lucretia, 1515 circa, oil on panel, 84×68 cm, Vienna, Kunsthistoriches Museum, Gemaeldegalerie
 Portrait of Isabella d'Este, 1536, oil on canvas, 102×64 cm, Vienna, Kunsthistoriches Museum, Gemaeldegalerie
 Portrait of Federico II Gonzaga, 1529 circa, oil on canvas, 125×99 cm, Madrid, Museo del Prado
 Portrait of Giulio Romano, oil on canvas, 102×87 cm, Mantova, Palazzo Te
 Man with a Glove, circa 1523, oil on canvas, 100×89 cm, Paris, Musée du Louvre
 Portrait of a man, 1523 circa, oil on canvas, 118×96 cm, Paris, Musée du Louvre
 The Madonna of the Rabbit, 1530 circa, oil on canvas, 71×85 cm, Paris, Musée du LouvreThe Supper at Emmaus, 1540 circa, oil on canvas, 169×244 cm, Paris, Musée du Louvre
 Saint Jerome in Penitence, oil on canvas, 80×102 cm, Paris, Musée du Louvre
 Portrait of Francesco Gonzaga, tempera on panel, 25,5×18 cm, Naples, Museo Nazionale di Capodimonte
 Eleven Caesars, set of eleven works lost in a fire at the Alcazar near Madrid

 V 
Various artists (designs by)Gonzaga Tapestries*Veronese 
 Judith with the Head of Holofernes, oil on canvas, 111×110 cm, Vienna, Kunsthistorisches Museum
Antonio Maria Viani
 Annunciation to the Virgin Mary, oil on canvas, 54,5×42,5 cm, Siena, Pinacoteca Nazionale

 Notes 

 Bibliography 
 Raffaella Morselli (ed), La Celeste Galleria, Milan, Skira, 2002.
 
 
 Adelaide Murgia, I Gonzaga'', Milan,  Mondadori, 1972.

External links